The University North is a public university in Croatia that operates in two university centres, Koprivnica and Varaždin. It is the fifth largest university in Croatia based on the number of students and the only public university operating in Northern Croatia alongside the University of Zagreb. The university was founded in 2015 by merging the University of Applied Sciences in Varaždin and the Media University in Koprivnica, thus becoming the eighth Croatian public university.

Departments
The university is organized in 20 departments.

University centre Koprivnica 
 Department of Media and Communication
 Department of Environmental protection, recycling and packaging
 Department of Communication, Media and Journalism
 Department of Logistics and Sustainable Mobility
 Department of Business and Management
 Department of Food Technology
 Department of Art Studies
 Department of Computing and Informatics

University centre Varaždin 
 Department of Economics
 Department of Electrical Engineering
 Department of Physiotherapy
 Department of Geodesy and Geomatics
 Department of Music and Media
 Department of Construction
 Department of Mechatronics
 Department of Multimedia
 Department of Public Communications
 Department of Nursing
 Department of Mechanical Engineering
 Department of Technical and Economic Logistics

Gallery

References 

Universities and colleges in Croatia
2015 establishments in Croatia
Educational institutions established in 2015